Batia Shviki (born 1954) is an Israeli Paralympic athlete . She won two gold medals and one bronze medal. She was inducted into the  Women's Basketball Hall of Fame.

Life 
In her youth she started training at a sports center for disabled people. She graduated from Hasharon High School and Tel Aviv University.

At the 1968 Summer Paralympics, in Tel Aviv, she won a gold medal in the Women's Slalom B, a bronze medal in the 60 meter race competition, and a gold medal in Wheelchair Basketball. She competed in Women's 50 meter Breaststroke Class 3 incomplete, Women's 50 m Backstroke Class 3 incomplete, Women's Discus Throw C, Women's Javelin C, and Women's Club Throw C.

At the 1972 Summer Paralympics, in Heidelberg, she competed in the Women's 60 meter Wheelchair 3, and Women's 4 x 40 meter Open. In both competitions she was finished fifth. She finished fourteenth, in the slalom competition.

She participated in the women's wheelchair basketball team and was a partner in winning a gold medal in the Toronto Paralympics (1976) and silver medals in the Arnhem Paralympics (1980) and the New York and Stoke Mandeville Paralympics (1984) .

She also participated in the wheelchair basketball team in the 1988 Summer Paralympics, in Seoul .

References 

1954 births
Living people
Tel Aviv University alumni
Paralympic wheelchair basketball players of Israel
Paralympic athletes of Israel
Israeli women's wheelchair basketball players
Athletes (track and field) at the 1968 Summer Paralympics
Athletes (track and field) at the 1972 Summer Paralympics
Swimmers at the 1968 Summer Paralympics
Wheelchair basketball players at the 1968 Summer Paralympics
Wheelchair basketball players at the 1988 Summer Paralympics
Paralympic gold medalists for Israel
Paralympic bronze medalists for Israel
Medalists at the 1968 Summer Paralympics